Our Lady of the Sacred Heart is a title of the Blessed Virgin Mary. The origin of this Marian title goes back to Father Jules Chevalier, the founder of the Missionaries of the Sacred Heart.

History
In 1854, in Issoudun, during the novena of the Immaculate Conception, Father Jules Chevalier promised that if his dream of forming a missionary congregation in honor of the Sacred Heart of Jesus comes true, he will teach the faithful to love the Virgin Mary in a peculiar way. The congregation would consider Mary as her foundress and her sovereign, and they will associate her with all her works.

During various novenas made to the Virgin Mary, Fr. Chevalier obtained several financial donations that allowed him to build the Basilica of Our Lady of the Sacred Heart in Issoudun, and in 1857 he consolidated his congregation and henceforth venerated Mary under the title of Our Lady of the Sacred Heart.

Iconography 

In 1861, Fr. Chevalier had a stained glass window made, where Mary and Jesus appear standing, the child touches his heart with his left hand and with his right hand points to his mother on high, sending the message that through Mary the faithful can reach the Most Sacred Heart of Jesus. 

In 1868, Pope Pius IX blessed a couple of crowns which are placed in the stained glass window of Our Lady of the Sacred Heart, and the congregation became an archconfraternity. 

In 1874, Pope Pius IX raised the sanctuary to the status of a Minor Basilica. on  Benedict XV granted a second decree of coronation of the image in 1919. 

At the end of the 19th century, the devotion to Our Lady of the Sacred Heart spread throughout America and Europe. The iconography of was slightly changed in the way that Jesus appears as a child in his mother's arms, while Mary showed the heart of her son.

In 1910, Pope Pius X granted a decree of coronation towards one of another image of Our Lady of the Sacred Heart which belongs to the Archconfraternity of the Our Lady of the Sacred Heart in Averbode Abbey, Belgium.

References

Catholic devotions
Catholic Mariology
Catholic Church in France
Titles of Mary
1857 in France
1857 in Christianity
May 1857 events